Porcellio spinipennis is a species of woodlouse in the genus Porcellio belonging to the family Porcellionidae that can be found in such European countries as Austria, France, Germany, Italy, and Slovakia.

References

Porcellionidae
Crustaceans described in 1885
Woodlice of Europe